FSC Mariupol is a Ukrainian professional football club based in the city of Mariupol. The team currently plays in the Ukrainian First League.

The club is forced temporarily to play near Kyiv in Demydiv as Russian military occupied the city of Mariupol.

History

The team was founded in 2007 as Lider. In 2017 the club changed its name to Yarud. It debuted in the Ukrainian Second League in the 2020–21 season, adopting its current name—FSC Mariupol—at the start of the next season as another FC Mariupol was forced to withdraw from competition due to the Russian aggression.

Current squad

League and cup history

{|class="wikitable"
|-bgcolor="#efefef"
! Season
! Div.
! Pos.
! Pl.
! W
! D
! L
! GS
! GA
! P
!Domestic Cup
!colspan=2|Europe
!Notes
|-bgcolor=SteelBlue
|align=center|2017–18
|align=center|4th
|align=center|7
|align=center|16
|align=center|4
|align=center|5
|align=center|7
|align=center|20
|align=center|19
|align=center|17
|align=center|
|align=center|
|align=center|
|align=center|
|-bgcolor=SteelBlue
|align=center|2018–19
|align=center|4th
|align=center|9
|align=center|22
|align=center|6
|align=center|6
|align=center|10
|align=center|24
|align=center|20
|align=center|24
|align=center|
|align=center|
|align=center|
|align=center|
|-bgcolor=SteelBlue
|align=center|2019–20
|align=center|4th
|align=center|4
|align=center|18
|align=center|12
|align=center|3
|align=center|3
|align=center|37
|align=center|14
|align=center|39
|align=center|
|align=center|
|align=center|
|align=center bgcolor=lightgreen|Promoted
|-bgcolor=PowderBlue
|align=center|2020–21
|align=center|3rd
|align=center|
|align=center|	
|align=center|	 	
|align=center|		
|align=center|
|align=center|	 	 	
|align=center|	
|align=center|
|align=center|
|align=center|
|align=center|
|align=center|
|-bgcolor=PowderBlue
|align=center|2021–22
|align=center|3rd
|align=center|
|align=center|	
|align=center|	 	
|align=center|		
|align=center|
|align=center|	 	 	
|align=center|	
|align=center|
|align=center|
|align=center|
|align=center|
|align=center bgcolor=lightgreen|Admitted to FL
|-bgcolor=LightCyan
|align=center|2022–23
|align=center|2nd "A"
|align=center|
|align=center|
|align=center|
|align=center|
|align=center|
|align=center|
|align=center|
|align=center|
|align=center|
|align=center|
|align=center|
|align=center|
|}

Managers
 2018–2018 Artem Savin
 2017–2020 Dmytro Yesin
 2020–2021  Volodymyr Kilikevych
 2021–  Oleh Krasnopyorov

References

External links
 Profile  at AAFU
 "Yarud" (Mariupol): known names, football of Mariupol and second chance for the youth ("Яруд" (Маріуполь): відомі імена, маріупольський футбол та другий шанс для молоді). Footboom. 25 February 2018.
 Dmytro Yesin, "The task is not to get lower in the tournament standings (Дмитро Єсін: "Завдання – не понизитися в турнірній таблиці"). Footboom (Artur Valerko). 17 February 2020.

 
Ukrainian First League clubs
Football clubs in Mariupol
2007 establishments in Ukraine
Association football clubs established in 2007